Tony Gaudio, A.S.C.  (20 November 1883 – 10 August 1951) was an Italian-American cinematographer and sometimes is cited as the first to have created a montage sequence for a film.

Biography
Born Gaetano Antonio Gaudio in Cosenza, Italy, he began his career shooting short subjects for Italian film companies. He moved to New York City in 1906 and worked in Vitagraph's film laboratory until 1909, when he began shooting shorts for the company. His credits include Hell's Angels (1930), Little Caesar (1931), The Lady Who Dared (1931), Tiger Shark (1932), Anthony Adverse (1936), The Story of Louis Pasteur (1936), The Life of Emile Zola (1937), God's Country and the Woman (Warner Brothers' first Three-strip Technicolor film, (1937), The Adventures of Robin Hood (1938), Juarez (1939), The Letter (1940), High Sierra (1941), Corvette K-225 (1943), Days of Glory (1944), A Song to Remember (1945), and The Red Pony (1949).

Gaudio was a favorite of Bette Davis and worked on 11 of her films, including Ex-Lady, Fog Over Frisco, Front Page Woman, Bordertown, The Sisters, Juarez, The Letter, and The Great Lie.

Gaudio won the Academy Award for Best Cinematography for Anthony Adverse and was nominated five additional times, for Hell's Angels, Juarez, The Letter, Corvette K-225, and A Song to Remember. He was among the founders of the American Society of Cinematographers.

He died in 1951 and is interred in the Hollywood Forever Cemetery in Hollywood, California. His brother Eugene Gaudio, also a cinematographer, died in 1920 at the age of 34.

Selected filmography

 The Woman in Black (1914)
 Mister 44 (1916)
 Pidgin Island (1916)
 The Hidden Spring (1917)
 The Promise (1917) 
 The Hidden Children (1917)
 The Square Deceiver (1917)
 Broadway Bill (1918)
 The Landloper (1918)
 The Unpardonable Sin (1919)
 Atonement (1919)
 The Red Lantern (1919)
 Whispering Devils (1920)
 An Adventuress (1920)
 Kismet (1920)
 The Forbidden Thing (1920)
 The Sin of Martha Queed (1921)
 The Other Woman (1921)
 The Ten Dollar Raise (1921)
 Pilgrims of the Night (1921)
 Shattered Idols (1922)
 The Woman He Loved (1922)
 East Is West (1922)
 The Voice from the Minaret (1923)
 Ashes of Vengeance (1923)
 Secrets (1924)
 The Lady (1925)
 Déclassée (1925)
 Sealed Lips (1925)
 The Price of Success (1925)
 Graustark (1925)
 The Temptress (1926)
 The Blonde Saint (1926)
 An Affair of the Follies (1927)
 The Notorious Lady (1927)
 Two Arabian Knights (1927)
 The Gaucho (1927)
 The Racket (1928)
 On with the Show! (1929)
 General Crack (1930)
 Tiger Shark (1932)
 Upper World (1934)
 The Man with Two Faces (1934)
 The Life of Emile Zola (1937)
 The Amazing Dr. Clitterhouse (1938)
 Torchy Blane in Panama (1938)
 The Adventures of Robin Hood (1938)
 The Amazing Dr. Clitterhouse (1938)
 Garden of the Moon (1938)

External links

 
 

1883 births
1951 deaths
Italian emigrants to the United States
American cinematographers
Best Cinematographer Academy Award winners
Burials at Hollywood Forever Cemetery
People from Cosenza